Takamatsu City General Gymnasium is an arena in Takamatsu, Kagawa, Japan. It is the home arena of the Kagawa Five Arrows of the B.League, Japan's professional basketball league.

References

External links
Takamatsu Gymnasium

Basketball venues in Japan
Indoor arenas in Japan
Kagawa Five Arrows
Sports venues in Kagawa Prefecture
Takamatsu, Kagawa
Sports venues completed in 1986
1986 establishments in Japan